The Women's field hockey event for the 2010 Commonwealth Games was held at the Dhyan Chand National Stadium from 4–13 October 2010. The Gold medal was won by Australia, who defeated New Zealand 4–2 on penalty strokes after the match had finished 2–2. England won the bronze medal by defeating South Africa 1–0.

Umpires
Twelve umpires for the women's event were appointed by the International Hockey Federation.

Gillian Batey (CAN)
Irene Clelland (SCO)
Frances Block (ENG)
Elena Eskina (RUS)
Nor Piza Hassan (MAS)
Kelly Hudson (NZL)
Michelle Joubert (RSA)
Irene Presenqui (ARG)
Anupama Puchimanda (IND)
Chieko Soma (JPN)
Melissa Trivic (AUS)
Dino Willox (WAL)

Results

Preliminary round

Pool A

Pool B

Fifth to tenth place classification

Ninth and tenth place

Seventh and eighth place

Fifth and sixth place

First to fourth place classification

Semifinals

Bronze medal match

Gold medal match

Statistics

Goalscorers
6 Goals

 Pietie Coetzee

5 Goals
 Surinder Kaur

4 Goals

 Nicole Arrold
 Emily Hurtz
 Megan Rivers
 Crista Cullen
 Clarissa Eshuis
 Katie Glynn

3 Goals

 Ashleigh Nelson
 Samantha Harrison
 Anna Thorpe
 Alison Bell
 Dirkie Chamberlain

2 Goals

 Madonna Blyth
 Shelly Liddelow
 Robyn Pendleton
 Diana Roemer
 Charlotte Craddock
 Alex Danson
 Georgie Twigg
 Jasjeet Kaur Handa
 Rani Rampal
 Ritu Rani
 Deepika Thakur
 Norbaini Hashim
 Holly Cram
 Nikki Kidd
 Ailsa Robertson
 Jennifer Wilson
 Sarah Thomas

1 Goal

 Casey Eastham
 Kate Hollywood
 Jayde Taylor
 Katie Baker
 Anna Kozniuk
 Chloe Rogers
 Ashleigh Ball
 Nicola White
 Saba Anjum
 Chanchan Devi Thokchom
 Norfaraha Hashim
 Nadia Abdul Rahman
 Fazilla Sylvester Silin
 Gemma Flynn
 Krystal Forgesson
 Charlotte Harrison
 Stacey Michelsen
 Anita Punt
 Kayla Sharland
 Linda Clement
 Samantha Judge
 Sulette Damons
 Farah Fredericks
 Lesle-Ann George
 Kelly Madsen
 Kathleen Taylor
 Stacey-Ann Siu Butt
 Charlene Williams
 Blair Wynne
 Emma Batten
 Claire Lowry
 Abigail Welsford
 Leah Wilkinson

Final standings

References

2010
Women's tournament
2010 in women's field hockey
International women's field hockey competitions hosted by India